Andrés Javier Mosquera Murillo (born 19 September 1989 in Medellín, Colombia) is a Colombian former professional footballer who played as a forward.

Teams
 La Equidad 2010
 Bogotá FC 2011–2012
 Independiente Medellín 2012
 Bogotá FC 2013
 Deportivo Pasto 2013–2014
 Deportes Copiapó 2014–2015

References
 
 
 

1989 births
Living people
Colombian footballers
Footballers from Medellín
Association football forwards
Categoría Primera A players
Primera B de Chile players
La Equidad footballers
Bogotá FC footballers
Deportivo Pasto footballers
Independiente Medellín footballers
Deportes Copiapó footballers
Portuguesa F.C. players
Envigado F.C. players
Unión Deportivo Universitario players
Colombian expatriate footballers
Colombian expatriate sportspeople in Chile
Expatriate footballers in Chile
Colombian expatriate sportspeople in Panama
Expatriate footballers in Panama